Wordie Seamount is a seamount located in Bransfield Strait, Antarctica.  The feature is named after James Wordie, geologist on Ernest Shackleton's 1914 expedition to Antarctica.

Location

References

Seamounts of the Southern Ocean